Nick Hardt (born 20 September 2000) is a Dominican tennis player.

Hardt has a career high ATP singles ranking of world No. 201 achieved on 12 December 2022 and doubles ranking of No. 399 achieved on 3 October 2022.

Hardt represents the Dominican Republic in the Davis Cup. He is currently the No. 1 Dominican player.

Junior career 
Hardt was ranked No. 16 in the world junior rankings by the ITF on 5 March 2018. 

In 2016, he won the Copa Merengue tournament in Santo Domingo, Dominican Republic.

In 2017, he reached the quarterfinals of the Eddie Herr ITF tournament. 

In 2018, he reached the quarterfinals of the 2018 French Open Junior Championships and the third round in the 2018 U.S. Open Junior Championships. Hardt also reached the finals of the 2018 Porto Alegre Junior Championships losing to the No. 1 ranked junior in the world Sebastián Báez in the finals.

Professional career

2017: Davis Cup debut
Hardt was first nominated to the team for the 2017 Davis Cup and faced Chilean tennis player Nicolás Jarry in his first match.

2022: Maiden Challenger final, top 250 debut
He reached his maiden Challenger final at the 2022 JC Ferrero Challenger Open. As a result he moved more than 35 positions up to a new career-high in the top 250 on 10 October 2022.

Future/ITF World Tennis Tour and Challenger finals

Singles: 13 (9–4)

Doubles: 8 (6–2)

Davis Cup

Participations: (5–8)

   indicates the outcome of the Davis Cup match followed by the score, date, place of event, the zonal classification and its phase, and the court surface.

References

External links

2000 births
Living people
People from Santiago de los Caballeros
Dominican Republic male tennis players
Tennis players at the 2018 Summer Youth Olympics
Central American and Caribbean Games medalists in tennis
Central American and Caribbean Games gold medalists for the Dominican Republic